Mars Audiac Quintet is the third studio album by English-French rock band Stereolab. It was released on 2 August 1994 and was issued by Duophonic Records and Elektra Records.

Recording
Stereolab recorded Mars Audiac Quartet in March and April 1994. Keyboardist Katharine Gifford joined the band for the recording of the album. During recording, guitarist Sean O'Hagan left as a full-time member in order to focus on his band the High Llamas, but continued to be a session musician for the band ever since.

Composition
AllMusic critic Heather Phares characterised Mars Audiac Quintet as a more pop-oriented affair than previous Stereolab albums, noting that it largely highlights the band's brand of space age pop.

The song "International Colouring Contest" is a tribute to Lucia Pamela and opens with a sample of her voice.

Release
Mars Audiac Quartet was released on 2 August 1994 in the United States by Elektra Records, and on 8 August 1994 in the United Kingdom by Duophonic Records. It peaked at number 16 on the UK Albums Chart. The tracks "Ping Pong" and "Wow and Flutter" were released as singles on 18 July 1994 and 17 October 1994, respectively.

A remastered and expanded edition of Mars Audiac Quintet was released by Duophonic and Warp on 3 May 2019.

Critical reception and legacy

Richard Fontenoy, writing in The Rough Guide to Rock, said that Mars Audiac Quintet elevated Stereolab "firmly into the higher stratum of indie pop". In 2003, Pitchfork ranked Mars Audiac Quintet as the 78th best album of the 1990s.

The American indie rock band Transona Five took their name from the title of the third track on the album.

Track listing

Sample credits
 "International Colouring Contest" contains a sample of Into Outer Space with Lucia Pamela, written by Lucia Pamela.

Personnel
Credits are adapted from the album's liner notes.

Stereolab
 Tim Gane – guitar, Farfisa and Vox organs, Moog synthesizer, bass
 Lætitia Sadier – vocals, tambourine, Mint's and Vox organs, guitar
 Duncan Brown – bass
 Katharine Gifford – Farfisa and Vox organs, Moog synthesizer, backing vocals on "Transporté sans bouger"
 Mary Hansen – vocals, guitar, tambourine, egg shaker
 Sean O'Hagan – marimba, slide guitar, brass arrangements, guitar twang on "Ping Pong", guitar tremolo on "International Colouring Contest", percussion on "Fiery Yellow"
 Andy Ramsay – drums, percussion

Additional musicians
 Alan Carter – tenor saxophone, flute
 Vera Daucher – violin
 Jean-Baptiste Garnero – backing vocals on "Transporté sans bouger"
 Lindsay Low – trumpet
 Andy Robinson – trombone

Production
 Steve Rooke – mastering
 Stereolab (credited as "The Groop") – mixing
 Paul Tipler – engineering, mixing
 Nick Webb – mastering

Design
 Peter Morris – photography
 Trouble – layout

Charts

References

External links
 Mars Audiac Quintet at official Stereolab website
 
 

1994 albums
Stereolab albums
Elektra Records albums